Fang and Claw is a 1935 jungle adventure documentary starring Frank Buck. Buck continues his demonstration of the ingenious methods by which he traps wild birds, mammals and reptiles in Johore.

Scenes
Among the scenes in the film: 
 Buck shoots a tiger attacking a young rhino and captures the rhino.
 Buck captures a bird of paradise
Buck captures a   python by shooting off the tree limb supporting the snake
Buck captures a large group of monkeys by luring them with tapioca.”

Behind the camera
The film took nine months to make. A  python cinematographer Harry E. Squire was helping Buck to force into a box left a   wound on Squire’s right arm.

Reception
“The intrepid Mr. Buck displays his ingenuity and courage…Fang and Claw will be welcomed by the youngsters."

The film made a profit of $46,000 for RKO.

References

External links

1935 films
American black-and-white films
RKO Pictures films
1935 adventure films
American adventure films
1935 documentary films
American documentary films
1930s English-language films
1930s American films